Dinoptera collaris is the species of the Lepturinae subfamily in long-horned beetle family.

Subtaxa 
There are four varietets in species:
 Dinoptera collaris var. fulvohirsuta Hayrovsky
 Dinoptera collaris var. marginicollis Tippmann
 Dinoptera collaris var. nigricollis Mulsant
 Dinoptera collaris var. slamai Podaný, 1955

Distribution
Theses beetles are present in most of Europe and in the Near East (Albania, Austria, Belgium, Bulgaria, Croatia, Czech Republic, Denmark, France, Germany, Greece, Hungary, Iran, Italy, Luxembourg, Netherlands, Norway, Poland, Portugal, Romania, Russia, Serbia, Slovakia, Slovenia, Spain, Sweden, Switzerland, Syria, Turkey, and United Kingdom).

Habitat
This species inhabit deciduous forests, especially beech forests and hedge rows.

Description

Elytra are bluish-blackish and rather hairy, with dense puncture. Pronotum is almost spherical, usually orange-red, sometimes dark, with sparse punctuation. Antennae are quite long. The abdomen is orange-red.

This species is rather similar to Acmaeops marginatus, Acmaeops pratensis and Acmaeops septentrionis.

Biology
The life cycle lasts two years. The larvae develop under the loose bark, especially of oaks, aspens or apple trees. They are polyphagous wood borers in deciduous trees (Quercus, Pyrus, Acer, Fraxinus, Populus, Malus, Cornus etc.)  They overwinter and pupate the following spring.

The adult beetles can be found from April to August feeding on pollen of valerians (Valeriana species), common hawthorn (Crataegus monogyna), elderberry (Sambucus species), sweet chestnut (Castanea sativa) and European pear (Pyrus communis).

References

External links
 Atlas of beetles of Russia - Beetles and Coleopterologists

Lepturinae
Beetles described in 1758
Taxa named by Carl Linnaeus